Wilbur House is a historic home located on Main Street in Fairport in Monroe County, New York. It is a Second Empire–style structure built about 1873 that features a two-bay, 2-story tower that projects from the northeast corner of the -story front section.  The tower, as well as the rest of the front section, is covered by a decorative fish scale and octagonal slate mansard roof.  Also on the property is a contributing carriage house.

It was listed on the National Register of Historic Places in 1980.

Hiram P. Wilbur was the superintendent (some say the first such) of the westernmost section of the Erie Canal, and also the postmaster for the town of Perinton. The home he built in 1873 later served as a boarding school before reverting to a private residence. The house is currently  with five bedrooms. Many of the historic details have been retained, including speaking tubes for intra-house communication.

References

Houses on the National Register of Historic Places in New York (state)
Second Empire architecture in New York (state)
Houses completed in 1873
Houses in Monroe County, New York
National Register of Historic Places in Monroe County, New York